The Norwegian Benchrest Shooting Association, Norwegian Norges Benkeskytterforbund (NBSF), is the Norwegian association for benchrest shooting under the World Benchrest Shooting Federation (WBSF), as well as the long range disciplines 500 UNL and F-Class. The organization was founded in 1996

While most benchrest matches in Norway and the rest of the world are held at 100 and 200 meters, 500 m benchrest matches are a unique Norwegian benchrest discipline which has been considered as a crossover discipline between benchrest and long range shooting. The first 500 m benchrest event in Norway was conducted in March 2007.

The long range discipline F-Class shooting was added as a discipline in 2011, and the first Norwegian national F-Class championship was held in 2017.

Formerly NBSF had a members magazine called Benkeskytteren (The Benchrest Shooter).

Shooting disciplines 
Benchrest disciplines
 BR50
 WBSF Light Varmint
 WBSF Heavy Varmint
 National Hunter
 National Sporter

Long range disciplines
 F-Class
 500 meter unlimited (UNL) (National benchrest discipline)

See also

Other shooting sport organizations in Norway 
 Norwegian Shooting Association
 Det frivillige Skyttervesen
 Dynamic Sports Shooting Norway
 Norwegian Association of Hunters and Anglers
 Norwegian Black Powder Union
 Norwegian Biathlon Association
 Norwegian Metal Silhouette Association
 Scandinavian Western Shooters

References

External links 
 Official webpage of the Norges Benkeskytterforbund

1996 establishments in Norway
Sports organisations of Norway